Hasanabad-e Padam (also Romanized as Ḩasanābād-e Padam; also known as Ḩasanābād) is a village in Nasrovan Rural District, in the Central District of Darab County, Fars Province, Iran. At the 2006 census, its population was 213, in 46 families.

References 

Populated places in Darab County